Catherine Theodora, Lady Macartney (1877–1949). Catherine (née Borland) was born in Bexley, Kent, England. She was the second daughter of James Borland born 1836 in Castle Douglas, Scotland. In 1898, she married Sir George Macartney, the British Consul in Kashgar. Catherine's father  had studied in Scotland with George Macartney's father, Halliday Macartney.

In 1915 Percy Sykes and Ella Sykes journeyed to Tashkent to relieve them. The journey took them over a month. Whilst they were there they travelled further. Ella was the first British woman to pass through the "Katta Dawan" pass that was 13,000 feet high. Their journey home also took a month and these journeys were recorded in photographs.

Catherine published her memoirs detailing her time in Kashgar in 1931. She helped the archaeologists who discovered the Dunhuang manuscripts.

The Macartneys  had three children: Eric Borland Macartney (1903–1994), Sylvia Theodora Macartney (1906–1950) and Robin Halliday Macartney (1911–1973). Eric was born in England, shortly before the Macartneys were due to return to Kashgar. Lady Macartney  travelled, accompanied by a nurse, with her newborn child through Central Asia to Kashgar.

She died in Charminster, Dorset, England in 1949.

References

People from Castle Douglas
Scottish memoirists
Scottish women writers
Scottish people of the British Empire
1877 births
1949 deaths
British women memoirists
British expatriates in China